"Can We Chill" is a song recorded by American singer and songwriter Ne-Yo, taken as the third single from the singers second studio album, Because of You (2007). The song became Ne-Yo's lowest charting single in the U.S. and second lowest in the UK. In the U.S., "Can We Chill" failed to chart on the Billboard Hot 100 altogether and only peaked at #52 on the Billboard Hot R&B/Hip-Hop Songs.

In the UK, "Can We Chill" outperformed previous single "Do You", peaking at number sixty-two on the UK Singles Chart, despite the music video receiving limited airplay before being removed from TV airplay schedules altogether. There was also confusion regarding the singles release date, with some retailers pushing the date back to the 15 October 2007, whereas the 1 October release still remained, despite airplay being limited (the video was premiered in the UK three days before the song's release).

Formats and track listings

UK CD:
 "Can We Chill" (album version)
 "Spotlight" (S. Smith, M. Sparkman, M. Allen)

UK Promo:
 "Can We Chill" (new edit)
 "Can We Chill" (main)
 "Can We Chill" (instrumental)

Music video
The video for "Can We Chill" premiered on 106 & Park on September 25.  The video was shown as a First Look on TRL on October 3, 2007 and  debuted at number eight on October 8, 2007. Costume design June Ambrose

The music video was shot in Santo Domingo, Dominican Republic, and shows Ne-Yo in various locations such as a cave and on a beach. He flirts with girls throughout the video until he sees a girl he likes. He follows her into the cave which eventually becomes a nightclub, which is a real cave/ night club in Santo Domingo known as "Club Los Tres Ojos". He starts dancing with various girls but ends up dancing with the girl he likes. He leans in to kiss her but instead they keep dancing.

Chart positions

References

2007 singles
Ne-Yo songs
Songs written by Eric Hudson
Songs written by Ne-Yo
2007 songs
Def Jam Recordings singles
Song recordings produced by Eric Hudson